Holly Cole is a studio album by Holly Cole. It was released in Canada in 2007 on Alert Records.  The title of this release was originally announced as This House is Haunted.

Track listing
 "The House Is Haunted by the Echo of Your Last Goodbye" (Basil Adlam, Billy Rose) – 4:17
 "Charade" (Henry Mancini, Johnny Mercer) – 3:25
 "I Will Wait for You" (Norman Gimbel, Michel Legrand) – 4:31
 "Waters of March" (Antonio Carlos Jobim) – 4:22
 "Alley Cat Song" (Frank Bjorn, Jack Harlen) – 4:03
 "Larger Than Life" (Cole) – 3:37
 "Be Careful, It's My Heart" (Irving Berlin) – 2:06
 "It's Alright with Me" (Cole Porter) – 3:51
 "You're My Thrill" (Sidney Clare, Jay Gorney) – 5:46
 "Life Is Just a Bowl of Cherries" (Lew Brown, Ray Henderson) – 3:04
 "Reaching for the Moon" (Irving Berlin) – 4:06

Personnel
 Marty Ehrlich – alto saxophone (tracks 1, 2, 5, 6, 8, 9, 11)
 Robert DeBellis – baritone saxophone, bass clarinet (tracks: 3, 5, 8)
 David Piltch – bass (track 4)
 Greg Cohen – bass (tracks: 1–3, 5, 6, 8, 9, 11)
 Scott Robinson – bass saxophone (track 2)
 Steven Wolf – drums (tracks 1–3, 5, 6, 8, 9, 11)
 Vincent Chancey – French horn (tracks 1–3, 5, 8, 9, 11)
 Matt Munisteri – guitar (tracks: 1–3, 5, 8–11)
 Kevin Breit – guitar, loops (track 4)
 Aaron Davis – piano (tracks 4, 7)
 Gil Goldstein – piano (tracks 1–3, 5, 6, 8, 9, 11)
 Lenny Pickett – tenor saxophone (tracks 1, 2, 5, 8–11)
John Allred – trombone (tracks 1–3, 5, 8–11)
 Holly Cole – vocals

References

Holly Cole albums
2007 albums
Alert Records albums